DFW Airport Terminal B station is a current terminal Trinity Metro TEXRail station and future Dallas Area Rapid Transit (DART) Silver Line station located at Dallas/Fort Worth International Airport between Terminal B and is located near DFW Airport Terminal A station used by DART Light Rail.

Operations
The station is the northeastern terminus of the TEXRail line which begins at T&P Station in Fort Worth. It provides a transfer point between TEXRail and the DART Orange Line via a covered walkway. It is located between International Parkway and South Service Road, in the area between Terminals A and B. A covered walkway connects the station with the lower level of Terminal B at Door B43 (named after nearby Gate B43). A second covered walkway connects to the DFW Airport Terminal A station, making it possible for passengers to transfer between DART or TEXRail or directly access Terminal A.

Passengers can access all other terminals using the SkyLink train inside the secured area of the airport, or the Terminal Link bus system outside of the secured area.

Terminal B station will also be the terminus of DART's Silver Line when it is completed.

The station has connections to Trinity Metro route 31, the TRE Link, which boards on the arrivals level of Terminal B and offers service to CentrePort/DFW Airport station on the Trinity Railway Express commuter rail line. FlixBus intercity coaches also board from the covered walkway between this station and the Terminal A station.

Gallery

References

External links
Dallas Area Rapid Transit
TEXRail

TEXRail stations
Airport railway stations in the United States
Railway stations in the United States opened in 2019
2019 establishments in Texas
Dallas/Fort Worth International Airport
Railway stations in Tarrant County, Texas
Dallas Area Rapid Transit commuter rail stations